Folcroft station is a SEPTA train station on the Wilmington/Newark Line in Pennsylvania. The line offers southbound service to Wilmington and Newark, Delaware and northbound service to Philadelphia. Located at Primos and Elmwood Avenues in Folcroft, the station has a 43-space parking lot.

On May 28, 2009, SEPTA approved a $2.6 million rehabilitation effort which will include Folcroft station.

Station layout
Folcroft has two low-level side platforms with walkways connecting passengers to the inner tracks. Amtrak's Northeast Corridor lines bypass the station via the inner tracks.

References

External links
SEPTA – Folcroft Station
Folcroft PRR Station Image
 Primos Avenue entrance from Google Maps Street View

SEPTA Regional Rail stations
Stations on the Northeast Corridor
Railway stations in Delaware County, Pennsylvania
Wilmington/Newark Line